An aminosalicylate is a class of medications that is often used to treat ulcerative colitis and Crohn's disease. The class includes among others:
4-Aminosalicylic acid
Balsalazide
Olsalazine
Sulfasalazine
Mesalazine (5-Aminosalicylic acid)

Side effects may include abdominal pain, diarrhea, headaches, and nausea.

References

Drugs acting on the gastrointestinal system and metabolism
Salicylates